The 2008 Kentucky Wildcats baseball team represented the University of Kentucky in the NCAA Division I baseball season of 2008. The team's head coach was John Cohen. This was his 5th year as Kentucky's head coach. The Wildcats played their home games at Cliff Hagan Stadium in Lexington, Kentucky.

External links
2008 Schedule

References

Kentucky Wildcats baseball seasons
Kentucky Wildcats Baseball Team, 2008
Kentucky Wild
Kentucky